Aric is a masculine given name which may refer to:

 Aric Almirola (born 1984), American professional stock car racing driver
 Aric Anderson (born 1965), American former football player
 Aric Hagberg, American applied mathematician and academic
 Aric Nesbitt (born 1980), American politician, member of the Michigan Senate
 Aric Putnam, American politician elected to the Minnesota Senate in 2020
 Aric Sigman, British psychologist

Masculine given names